Breast flattening may refer to any of the following practices:

 Breast ironing
 Breast binding
 Breast reduction